Addison J. Hodges (November 26, 1842 – March 29, 1933) was a decorated hero of the Union Army in the American Civil War. He was born in Hillsdale, Michigan the sixth of ten children and lived in Adrian, Michigan.

War Service
Hodges mustered on 15 June 1861 to Company B of the 47th Ohio Volunteer Infantry Regiment.

According to the Military Times Hall of Valor, "on 3 May 1863, while serving with Company B, 47th Ohio Infantry, in action at Vicksburg, Mississippi. Private Hodges was one of a party which volunteered and attempted to run the enemy's batteries with a steam tug and two barges loaded with subsistence stores." Hodges and nine others in Company B did this while Confederate States Army batteries were shooting at them "under cover of darkness"

Captain William Henry Ward asked for ten volunteers, but originally got twelve. He got permission to take the twelve. Hodges was one of the original volunteers, but as many more men wanted to go, Hodges sold his spot. When Ward found out, he made Hodges go as well. These fifteen were joined by fifteen men of the 27th Missouri.  The tug towing the barges took a direct hit, blew up, and sank. The explosion set the two barges on fire. Sixteen of the thirty-five were taken prisoner. Only four of the thirty-five evaded capture. Fifteen had perished. The ten Prisoners of War from the 47th were freed when Vicksburg surrendered in July.

Rank and organization: Private, Company B, 47th Ohio Infantry. Place and date: At Vicksburg, MS., May 3, 1863

Citation:

Was one of a party that volunteered and attempted to run the enemy's batteries with a steam tug and 2 barges loaded with subsistence stores.

After liberation, Hodges rejoined the 47th and was promoted to Corporal. Hodges mustered out near Atlanta in May and liberated in September and mustered out 26 September 1864.

Post War
Hodges returned to Adrian, Michigan and married Eliza C Colvin (1845-1930). They had three children: Herman H Hodges (1867–1944), Alta Hodges Liston (1869–1963), and Alma Hodges Pollock (1879–1910). Hodges was awarded his Medal of Honor "for extreme bravery under fire" on December 31, 1907.

See also
Siege of Vicksburg
47th Ohio Volunteer Infantry Regiment
List of Medal of Honor recipients
List of American Civil War Medal of Honor recipients: G–L

Notes

References

External links
Civil War Index: 47th Ohio Infantry Soldier Roster
Civil War Index: 47th Ohio Infantry in the American Civil War

1842 births
1933 deaths
Union Army soldiers
United States Army Medal of Honor recipients
American Civil War recipients of the Medal of Honor
People from Michigan
People from Adrian, Michigan